Matamoros is a Spanish surname and place name meaning ‘Moor killer’. It may refer to:

Events 
 1999 Matamoros standoff, an armed engagement between gangsters and law enforcement in Matamoros, Tamaulipas
 2011 Matamoros mass kidnapping
 2023 Matamoros kidnappings

Music 
 "Matamoros", a song by The Afghan Whigs from Do to the Beast
 "Matamoros Banks", a song by Bruce Springsteen from Devils & Dust
 Matamoros Querido, a 1971 album by Rigo Tovar
"Mi Matamoros Querido", a song on Matamoros Querido

People 
Carlos Matamoros Franco (born 1966), Ecuadorian chess grandmaster
Mariano Matamoros (1770–1814), a liberal priest and insurgent active during the Mexican War of Independence
Miguel Matamoros (1894–1971), a Cuban musician and composer
Trio Matamoros, Cuban trova group founded by Miguel Matamoros
Saint James Matamoros, 'the Moor-slayer', Spanish mythological figure

Places
Matamoros, Coahuila, city in Mexico
Matamoros, Tamaulipas, also known as Heroica Matamoros, a city in Mexico, municipal seat of Matamoros Municipality, Tamaulipas
Matamoros–Brownsville metropolitan area, transnational conurbation along the Mexico–U.S. border
Matamoros Cathedral
Matamoros Municipality, Chihuahua
Matamoros Municipality, Coahuila
Matamoros Municipality, Tamaulipas
General Mariano Matamoros Airport, of Cuernavaca, Morelos, Mexico
Izúcar de Matamoros, city in the Mexican state of Puebla
Landa de Matamoros, city in the Mexican state of Querétaro
Mariano Matamoros, Chihuahua, town in Mexico
Tlacolula de Matamoros, city in the Mexican state of Oaxaca
Valle de Matamoros, municipality in the province of Badajoz, Extremadura, Spain

See also
 Matamoras (disambiguation)